The Brotherhood of Maintenance of Way Employes (BMWE) – later to become the Brotherhood of Maintenance of Way Employes Division of the International Brotherhood of Teamsters (BMWED) – is a national union representing the workers who build and maintain the tracks, bridges, buildings and other structures on the railroads of the United States.

History

Founded by John T Wilson in July 1887 at Demopolis, Alabama. Wilson met with other section foreman to discuss mutual problems of low wages, the hazards of their work, and the insecurity of their families. They decided to form, the Order of Railroad Trackmen to assist fellow railroad workers in times of sickness and financial trouble.
Once an international union with over 350,000 members in the United States and Canada, automation, the rise of the trucking and airline industries, coupled with railroad mergers have depleted the ranks of the BMWED to under 40,000 members.

In 2004 the BMWE merged with the International Brotherhood of Teamsters and consolidated its strength with that of the 1.4-million-member Teamsters Union.
They are in the Teamster Rail Conference along with the Brotherhood of Locomotive Engineers and Trainmen.

Leadership
Tony Cardwell was elected as President of the BMWED in June 2022, also elected was Staci Moody-Gilbert the first woman Vice President and Reese Saulter the first African American Vice President.

Organization

Grand Lodge President 
 1887: John T Wilson
 1908: A.B. Lowe
 1914: T.H. Gerrey
 1914: A.E. Barker
 1920: E.F. Grable
 1922: F.H. FFljozdal
 1940: E.E. Milliman
 1947: T.C. Carroll

BMWE accomplishments

Right of Representation,
Rules Agreements,
Overtime Pay,
Unemployment Benefits,
Paid Vacations,
Union Shop,
Off-Track, Vehicle Accident, Insurance Coverage,
Accidental Death, Dismemberment and Loss of Sight Benefits,
Job Security,
Health Insurance,
Checkoff of Dues,
Dental Insurance,
Bereavement Leave,
Protection against Discrimination,
Eight-hour day,
Retirement Benefits,
Sickness benefits,
Forty-hour Week,
Holiday Pay,
Life Insurance,
Improved Wage Rates,
Travel Time and Away-From-Home Expenses,
Jury Duty Pay,
Supplemental Sickness Benefits,
Early Retiree Major Medical Benefits,
Personal Leave

Employe spelling
When the union was started in the late 1800s, employe and employee were both valid spellings. The union has never changed the spelling out of respect for its past.

References

External links

 
 Teamster Rail Conference
 Guide to the Brotherhood of Maintenance of Way Employees Files, 1925–1970, at the Kheel Center for Labor-Management Documentation and Archives, Cornell University Library

Trade unions in the United States
Railway unions in the United States
International Brotherhood of Teamsters
Trade unions established in 1887